Anna Robinson (born ), better known by the mononym Robinson, is a New Zealand singer-songwriter and musician. Born in Nelson, she was educated at Garin College. Robinson released her first single "Don't You Forget About Me" in May 2017. In February 2018, Robinson signed to Sony Music Australia and Ministry of Sound. Her song "Nothing to Regret" reached the top 40 in Australia and New Zealand in 2018. She was set to be an opening act for the British girl group, Little Mix, on LM5: The Tour, before the cancellation of the Oceania tour dates.

Discography

EPs

Singles

As lead artist

As featured artist

Notes

References

1997 births
Living people
New Zealand women pop singers
People from Nelson, New Zealand
People educated at Garin College
Sony Music Australia artists
Year of birth missing (living people)